is a town located in Kamo District, Shizuoka Prefecture, Japan. ,   the town had an estimated population of 12,155 in 6264 households, and a population density of 160 persons per km².

Geography
Sandwiched to the east and west between the Amagi Mountains and Sagami Bay on the Pacific Ocean, Higashiizu has numerous hot springs. Warmed by the warm Kuroshio Current, the area enjoys a warm maritime climate with hot, humid summers and mild, cool winters. Parts of the town are within the borders of Fuji-Hakone-Izu National Park,

Neighboring municipalities
Itō
Izu
Kawazu

Demographics
Per Japanese census data, the population of Higashiizu has been in slow decline over the past 40 years.

Climate
The city has a climate characterized by characterized by hot and humid summers, and relatively mild winters (Köppen climate classification Cfa).

History
During the Edo period, all of Izu Province was tenryō territory under direct control of the Tokugawa shogunate, and the area now comprising Higashiizu Town consisted of 5 villages (Inatori, Naramoto, Shirata, Katase, and Ōkawa). With the establishment of the modern municipalities system in the early Meiji period in 1889, the area was reorganized into two villages (Inatori and Jōtō) with Kamo District. Inatori was elevated in status of that of a town in December 1920. The town of Higashiizu was founded on May 3, 1959 through the merger of the town of Inatori with the village of Jōtō.

Economy
The economy of Higashiizu is dominated by tourism centered on the hot spring resort industry, and by commercial fishing.

Education
Higashiizu has three public elementary schools and two public junior high schools operated by the town government, and one public high school operated by the Shizuoka Prefectural Board of Education.

Transportation

Railway
 - Izu Kyūkō Line
 -  -  -  -

Highway

Local attractions
 Atagawa Tropical & Alligator Garden
 Shimokamo Tropical Botanical Gardens

References

External links
Higashiizu official website (Japanese)

Towns in Shizuoka Prefecture
Populated coastal places in Japan
Higashiizu, Shizuoka